Brookula benthicola is a species of minute sea snail, a marine gastropod mollusc unassigned in the superfamily Seguenzioidea.

Distribution
This species is found near the South Island of New Zealand in deep water.

References

benthicola
Gastropods described in 1956